Şahbəyli or Shakhbeyli or Shebali or Shebaly may refer to:
Şahbəyli, Agsu, Azerbaijan
Şahbəyli, Kurdamir, Azerbaijan